Let the Wrong One In is an Irish horror comedy film written and directed by Conor McMahon. The film stars Karl Rice, Eoin Duffy, Hilda Fay, Lisa Haskins and Anthony Head. Let the Wrong One In was shown at festivals in 2021 but did not go on general release in Ireland until 2023. It received positive critical response.

Production
The film is loosely based on the novel and film Let the Right One In by John Ajvide Lindqvist. It was shot on location in various sites around Dublin, including the tourist attraction Bram Stoker's Castle Dracula (now closed).

Plot
Dublin supermarket worker Matt is too nice for his own good. When his older, estranged brother Deco is turned into a vampire, he’s faced with a dilemma.

Release
The film premiered at Fantastic Fest in Austin, Texas on 24 September 2021.

On Rotten Tomatoes, the film has an approval rating of 88% based on 16 reviews.

Let the Wrong One In won Best Visual Effects at the 2021 Screamfest Horror Film Festival. It was nominated for the Discovery Award at the 2022 Dublin International Film Festival.

References

External links
 
 

2021 comedy horror films
Irish comedy horror films
English-language Irish films
Vampire comedy films
2020s English-language films
Films set in Dublin (city)